Jessica Gentle (born 28 July 1996) is an Australian professional rugby league footballer who currently plays for the Newcastle Knights in the NRL Women's Premiership.

Background
Gentle was born in Coffs Harbour, New South Wales and attended Woolgoolga High School. She played soccer and rugby, and competed in cross country running and swimming. In soccer, she was a representative of the Australian Schoolgirls National team, was a part of the North Coast team where her team was the runner up in the State Youth League and earned a players' player award with the North Coast team in 2011 and 2014. She represented Northern NSW soccer at the National Youth Championships in 2010 and 2011 and was awarded the Pierre De Coubertin award for sporting achievement in her senior year.

Playing career

Early years
In 2015, Gentle travelled to the United States to play soccer for the Wyoming Cowgirls.

2022
In 2022, Gentle started playing rugby league for the Central Coast Roosters in the NSWRL Women's Premiership. In June, she played for the NSW Country side that beat Western Australia to win the Harvey Norman National Championships, scoring two tries. She later joined the Newcastle Knights' NRL Women's Premiership squad as a development player. In September, she won the Women's Country Championships Player of the Year award. Shortly afterwards, she was named in the extended squad for the Knights' round 5 2022 NRLW season clash with the St. George Illawarra Dragons, after having her contract upgraded to the top 24 squad. She subsequently made her NRLW debut for the Knights against the Dragons, scoring a try in the Knights' 30–8 win.

References

External links
Newcastle Knights profile

1996 births
Australian rugby league players
Newcastle Knights (NRLW) players
Rugby league wingers
Rugby league centres
Rugby league players from Coffs Harbour
Living people